Railway Mixed High School is an English medium high school in Erode, Tamil Nadu. It was established as an Anglo-Indian school in the year of 1916, primarily for the benefit of Railway Employee wards. Initially started as a primary school, it has been upgraded as a High school during 1997. It is now under the Administrative control of Salem railway division.

CBSE Curriculum
The school sent a proposal to transfer from Samacheer Kalvi curriculum to CBSE Curriculum, which was approved by the CBSE Board in 2015.

Centenary Celebration
The school celebrated its centenary on 3 October 2016. A postal cover was released by Southern Railway in commemoration of this centenary celebration.

See also
 Railway Colony Municipal Higher Secondary School

References 

Railway schools in India
High schools and secondary schools in Tamil Nadu
Schools in Erode district
Education in Erode
Educational institutions established in 1916
1916 establishments in India